The seventeenth series of Geordie Shore, a British television programme based in Newcastle Upon Tyne was filmed in February 2018, and began airing from 15 May 2018. It concluded following twelve episodes on 31 July 2018 making this the joint longest series to date. The series was filmed in Australia rather than Newcastle, making this the second series to be filmed here following the sixth series in 2013. Ahead of the series it was announced that former cast member Holly Hagan would be making a return to the show. Six new cast members joined the series, including Grant Molloy, Adam Guthrie and four Australians, Alex MacPherson, Nick Murdoch, Dee Nguyen, and Chrysten Zenoni. Zenoni had previously appeared in the fifth series of Ex on the Beach. The new cast members were to replace Aaron Chalmers and Marnie Simpson, who both announced that they'd quit the show, and Steph Snowdon who was fired after the sixteenth series.

Cast
 Chloe Ferry
 Nathan Henry
 Sophie Kasaei
 Holly Hagan
 Sam Gowland
 Abbie Holborn
 Alex MacPherson
 Dee Nguyen
 Nick Murdoch
 Grant Molloy
 Chrysten Zenoni
Adam Guthrie

Duration of cast

 = Cast member is featured in this episode.
 = Cast member arrives in the house.
 = Cast member voluntarily leaves the house.
 = Cast member leaves and returns to the house in the same episode.
 = Cast member returns to the house.
 = Cast member leaves the series.
 = Cast member returns to the series.
 = Cast member is not officially a cast member in this episode.

Episodes

Ratings

References

Series 17
2018 British television seasons